Abraham Kepsin Kalpumu (born 10 February 1980) is a Vanuatuan sprinter

Kepsin competed at the 2000 Summer Olympics held in Sydney, he entered the 100 metres and ran a personal best time of 11.12 seconds and finished 8th in his heat so didn't qualify for the next round.

References

External links
 

1980 births
Living people
Vanuatuan male sprinters
Athletes (track and field) at the 2000 Summer Olympics
Olympic athletes of Vanuatu